Military Airport Aigen im Ennstal is a military airport located  east of Aigen im Ennstal, Steiermark, Austria. It was temporarily closed in the wake of 1945

See also
List of airports in Austria

References

External links 
 Airport record for Military Airport Aigen im Ennstal at Landings.com
 

Airports in Austria
Styria

de:Fliegerhorst Fiala Fernbrugg